The 2017 Women's Hockey Africa Cup of Nations was the seventh edition of the Women's Hockey Africa Cup of Nations, the quadrennial international women's field hockey championship of Africa organised by the African Hockey Federation. It was held in Ismailia, Egypt from 22 to 29 October 2017.

Zambia withdrew before the tournament. The winner qualified for the 2018 Women's Hockey World Cup.

The five-time defending champions South Africa won their sixth title.

Teams

Results
All times are local (UTC+2).

Preliminary round

Classification round

Third and fourth place

Final

Final standings

Goalscorers

See also
2017 Men's Hockey Africa Cup of Nations

References

External links
Official website

Women's Hockey Africa Cup of Nations
Africa Cup of Nations
Hockey Africa Cup of Nations
Ismailia
International field hockey competitions hosted by Egypt
Hockey Africa Cup of Nations
Africa Cup of Nations